The Alexander Nevsky Cathedral is an orthodox cathedral on Toompea hill in central Tallinn, Estonia. It was built to a design by Mikhail Preobrazhensky in a typical Russian Revival style in 1894–1900, when the country was part of the Russian Empire. The cathedral is Tallinn's largest orthodox cupola church. It is dedicated to the grand prince of Kiev, and later saint, Alexander Nevsky who in 1242 won the Battle of the Ice on Lake Peipus, near the present-day border between Estonia and Russia. The late Russian patriarch Alexis II started his priestly ministry in the church.

The Alexander Nevsky Cathedral crowns the hill of Toompea which is one of several places where, according to legend, Kalev, father of the hero of the Estonian national epic Kalevipoeg, is said to have been buried. As the USSR was officially non-religious, many churches including the cathedral were left to fall into disrepair. The church has been meticulously restored since the end of the Soviet occupation of Estonia in 1991.

Construction and interior
The cathedral is richly decorated and has eleven bells cast in Saint Petersburg, the largest of which weighs about 16 tons, more than the other ten combined. It has three altars, with the northern altar dedicated to Vladimir I and the southern to St. Sergius of Radonezh.

The base of the building is Finnish granite. In the five onion domes, gilded iron crosses are seen. Inside are three gilded, carved wooden iconostases, along with four icon boxes. The icons of the iconostasis and icon boxes were painted in St. Petersburg on copper and zinc plates. The windows are decorated with stained glass.

Demolition plans

The cathedral was built during the period of late 19th century Russification and was disliked by many Estonians as a symbol of oppression that the Estonian authorities scheduled the cathedral for demolition in 1924, but the decision was never implemented due to lack of funds and the building's massive construction.

Gallery

See also
List of cathedrals in Estonia
Alexander Nevsky Cathedral, Warsaw, demolished after the restoration of Polish independence.                                                                                   
St. Panteleimon's Cathedral
List of large Orthodox cathedrals

References

External links

 Saint Alexander Nevsky Cathedral's page in Estonian Orthodox Church of Moscow Patriarchate website 
Estonica : History : Russification period
 Aleksandro-Nevskii Cathedral, 1894

Photos and videos
 360° QTVR fullscreen panorama of the Alexander Nevsky Cathedral's interior

Churches in Tallinn
Cathedrals in Estonia
Kesklinn, Tallinn
Churches completed in 1900
20th-century Eastern Orthodox church buildings
Church buildings with domes
Eastern Orthodox church buildings
Russian Revival architecture
Tallinn
Eastern Orthodox churches in Estonia
Tallinn Old Town